Hans Georg Vaupel (born September 11, 1934) is a German sculptor.

Vaupel was born in Bochum, Germany.  He studied sculpture from 1952 to 1954 at the Folkwangschule in Essen, Germany. From 1954 and 1956 he went on a study trip to Greece and Italy. Afterwards he continued his studies from 1957 to 1959 at the Werk und Kunstschule in Wiesbaden and from 1959 to 1961 at the Akademie der Bildenden Künste in Karlsruhe.

Since 1959 he has lived and worked in Karlsruhe. His most important works are the sculpture at the Elisabeth Selbert school in Karlsruhe and the Rappenbrunnen in Karlsruhe-Durlach. The sculpture at the Elisabeth Selbert school has a height of 3.10m (10 feet 2 inches) and is made of granite with a marmor sculpture. The Rappenbrunnen is also made of granite with a horse and bull head made of diabase which symbolize the names of the two crossing streets on which it has been erected.

Awards
Art prize of the city of Karlsruhe 1965

Works
Sculpture at the Elisabeth-Selbert -Schule in Karlsruhe
Rappenbrunnen in Karlsruhe-Durlach
Bust of Prof. Dr. Rudolf Criegee at the institute for organic chemistry in Karlsruhe

Exhibitions
1997, Xylon Museum+Werstätten at castle of Schwetzingen

References

External links
Hans Georg Vaupel in Stadtwiki Karlsruhe
Fountaines in Karlsruhe-Durlach

German artists
1934 births
Living people